The Home for Little Wanderers is a private non-profit child and family service agency. It has been part of the Massachusetts landscape for more than 200 years, making it the oldest agency of its kind in the nation and one of the largest in New England. Founded as an orphanage in 1799, The Home today plays a leadership role in delivering services to thousands of children and families each year through a system of residential, community-based and prevention programs, direct care services, and advocacy.
 
The Home's services include early intervention and prevention, foster care and adoption, clinical services, residential care, special education, and home-based family support.

The mission of The Home for Little Wanderers is to ensure the healthy behavioral, emotional, social and educational development and physical well-being of children and families living in at-risk circumstances. They do so through a series of integrated programs that include early childhood services, special education, therapeutic residential treatment, adoption, intensive foster care, clinical and family support in homes, schools, hospitals and clinics, and college and independent living preparation for youth who have aged out of state care.

The Home's main office is located at 10 Guest Street in Brighton and has other locations throughout Eastern Massachusetts.

See also
 Boston Female Asylum, precursor to the Home

References

External links
 The Home for Little Wanderers website
 
 Guidestar.org page, includes link to Form 990
 Home for Little Wanderers on Flickr.
 Abraham, Y. A final goodbye to a longtime refuge.  Boston Globe. August 30, 2012

 Adams, B. The Home.  Tag Archives: Boston Globe.  August 30, 2012

Organizations established in 1799
History of Boston
South End, Boston
1799 establishments in Massachusetts